Energy is a peer-reviewed academic journal covering research on energy engineering that was established in 1976. It is published by Elsevier (formerly Pergamon Press) and the editor-in-chief is Henrik Lund (Aalborg University). According to the Journal Citation Reports, the journal has a 2020 impact factor of 7.147, ranking it 9th out of 112 journals in the category "Energy & Fuels" and second out of 55 journals in "Thermodynamics".

References

External links 
 

Elsevier academic journals
Publications established in 1976
English-language journals
Energy and fuel journals
Monthly journals